Canadian Olympics can mean: 

 Canadian Olympic Committee
 1976 Summer Olympics in Montreal, Quebec
 1988 Winter Olympics in Calgary, Alberta
 2010 Winter Olympics in Vancouver, B.C. 
 Canada at the Olympics
 Any of the failed Olympic host city bids:
 Montreal 1932 Winter Olympics bid
 Montreal 1936 Winter Olympics bid
 Montreal 1944 Winter Olympics bid
 Montreal 1944 Summer Olympics bid
 Montreal 1956 Winter Olympics bid
 Montreal 1956 Summer Olympics bid
 Calgary 1964 Winter Olympics bid
 Calgary 1968 Winter Olympics bid
 Calgary bid for the 2026 Winter Olympics
 Banff 1972 Winter Olympics bid
 Montreal 1972 Summer Olympics bid
 Whistler 1976 Winter Olympics bid
 Toronto 1996 Summer Olympics bid
 Quebec City 2002 Winter Olympics bid
 Toronto 2008 Summer Olympics bid

See also
 Canadian paralympics (disambiguation)
 1976 Summer Paralympics in Toronto, Ontario
 2010 Winter Paralympics in Vancouver, B.C.
 Canadian Paralympic Athletics Championships
 Canadian Commonwealth Games (disambiguation)
 Special Olympics Canada

Sports festivals in Canada